Susan Rose (born July 2, 1954) is an American cartoonist, animator, voice actress and television script writer. She is known for co-creating the character Fido Dido with Joanna Ferrone. She is also known for creating the children's television programs Pepper Ann, Angela Anaconda (with Joanna Ferrone) and Unfabulous.

Early life
Rose was born in Hudson, New York and attended Hudson High School. After graduating in 1971, she attended Boston School of the Museum of Fine Arts and the Hartford Art School.

Career
Rose and friend Joanna Ferrone first developed the character Fido Dido in 1985, after Rose drew him on a cocktail napkin at a restaurant. Ferrone named him "Fido Dido". They later stenciled Fido on T-shirts with the credo: "Fido is for Fido, Fido is against no one". Fido Dido was licensed to PepsiCo in 1988 and appeared on numerous products.

In 1996, Rose created the animated television series Pepper Ann. The series was produced by Walt Disney Television Animation and aired on Disney's One Saturday Morning block, debuting on September 13, 1997 on ABC. Pepper Ann began life as a comic strip created by Rose in the early 1990s for YM magazine. The animated series received popular and critical acclaim and earned numerous awards including Parent's Choice and Girls Inc.

Rose and Ferrone later created the animated television show Angela Anaconda, which aired on Fox Family Channel from 1999 to 2001. Rose was also the voice of Angela. The cut-out animation show also aired on Teletoon in Canada. The show earned Rose numerous awards and nominations, including nominations for Young Artist Award in 2000 and 2001, a Gemini Award in 2000, nominations for Daytime Emmys in 2000 and 2001, a nomination for an Annie Award in 2001, and a nomination for a BAFTA Award in 2002

In 2004, Rose's live-action tween sitcom Unfabulous debuted on Nickelodeon. The show starred Emma Roberts and ran through 2007.

Filmography

References

External links

1954 births
Writers from Topeka, Kansas
American animators
American television producers
American women television producers
American television writers
Living people
American women television writers
American women animators
Artists from Topeka, Kansas
Screenwriters from Kansas
21st-century American women
Disney Television Animation people